Alisson Becker (born 1992) is a Brazilian football goalkeeper.

Alisson may also refer to:

 Alisson (footballer, born 1993), Brazilian footballer attacking midfielder
 Alisson (footballer, born 1999), Brazilian footballer defensive midfielder
 Alisson Abarca (born 1996), Salvadoran model
 Alisson Farias (born 1996), Brazilian football striker
 Alisson Perticheto (born 1997), Swiss-Filipino figure skater

See also 
 Alison (disambiguation)
 Allison (disambiguation)
 Allisson (disambiguation)